The 1921 Kentucky Derby was the 47th running of the Kentucky Derby. The race took place on May 7, 1921. Behave Yourself was the upset winner of the 1921 Kentucky Derby over his stablemate, Black Servant.

Full results

Winning Breeder: Edward R. Bradley; (KY)
Horses Billy Barton, Grey Lag, and Firebrand scratched before the race.

Payout

 The winner received a purse of $38,450.
 Second place received $10,000.
 Third place received $5,000.
 Fourth place received $2,000.

References

1921
Kentucky Derby
Derby
Kentucky Derby
Kentucky Derby